Terrance Demon Simmons (born May 3, 1976) is a former American football defensive tackle in the National Football League for the Washington Redskins and the Carolina Panthers.  He played college football at Alabama State University.

1976 births
Living people
People from Pascagoula, Mississippi
American football defensive tackles
Alabama State Hornets football players
Washington Redskins players
Carolina Panthers players